Glasgow Tigers are a motorcycle speedway team from Glasgow, Scotland. Formed in 1928, the club adopted the Tigers nickname in 1946 and compete in the British SGB Championship. The team race at Ashfield Stadium, the home of Ashfield F.C., and celebrated their 75th anniversary in 2021.

History

1928 to 1945
Glasgow Speedway was formed in 1928 and were initially based at the White City Stadium on Paisley Road West in Ibrox, Glasgow (close to Rangers F.C.'s Ibrox Stadium). Other venues were also operating open meetings around this time at Carntyne Stadium, Celtic Park and Nelson Athletic Grounds in the Gallowgate area of the city. White City had been built in 1928 as a greyhound track and hosted speedway in the 1930 and 1931 Northern League and the 1939 Open/ACU Trophy. White City staged meetings from 1928 until 1931 and again from 1939 (Glasgow Lions) to 1940 and finally in 1945.

1946 to 1968
The Tigers raced at White City intermittently (1946 until 1954, 1956, and 1964 until 1968). Johnnie Hoskins was the promoter in 1945 and he handed the role over to his son Ian who promoted from 1946 to 1953. The track promoted two meetings staged in 1954 and ex-Tigers Tommy Miller and Junior Bainbridge were responsible for a short-lived venture in 1956. Trevor Redmond, in concert with the Hoskins family, reopened the track at White City in 1964 and rode for the Tigers that season before finally retiring as a rider. He continued as promoter until 1967. The team finished in 13th place during the inaugural 1965 British League season.

1969 to 1972 
The Tigers moved to Hampden Park in 1969 after the White City stadium was demolished to make way for the M8 motorway through Glasgow

1973 to 1986
In 1973 the club moved to Coatbridge and became the Coatbridge Tigers, riding at Cliftonhill, home of Albion Rovers F. C. The Tigers remained there until they moved to Blantyre in the middle of the 1977 season and re-introduced the name Glasgow Tigers. The Tigers rode in two stadiums in Blantyre, firstly at the Blantyre Greyhound Stadium. The bends at this track were unusual; the first and second bends were sweeping whilst the third and fourth were pointed giving the track an egg-shape. This stadium was demolished in advance of the construction of the East Kilbride Expressway and the Tigers moved in 1982 to Craighead Park. The track at Craighead Park was shoe-horned into a football stadium but was a more traditional oval shape.

1987 
In 1987 the Tigers moved to Derwent Park in Workington and although they started the year named as Glasgow, they were renamed Workington Tigers for the rest of what was an uncompleted season. This was the only time in the team's history that they have been based in England.

1988 to 1998
In 1988, the club returned to Glasgow when they moved into Shawfield Stadium, Rutherglen. The Tigers achieved a 'double double' feat in 1993 and 1994, winning both the British League Division Two Championship and Knockout Cup in consecutive years. The Tigers remained at Shawfield with the exception of the 1996 season when the poorly supported Scottish Monarchs rode there in top flight speedway.

1999 to present 
In 1999 the club moved to its current home at the Ashfield Stadium in Possilpark when the speedway track replaced an old greyhound racing track. The best placed finish from 1999 to 2010 was third place in 2006.

Prior to the 2011 season the club embarked on significant changes to the Ashfield track, extending its length by 17 meters on the inside, but more significantly widening the bends and increasing the banking, especially on bends three and four, opening up new racing lines in an effort to up the entertainment value of the meetings. Therefore, the final track record for the 302 meter track was 56.2s by Shane Parker on 8 August 2009. The Tigers won their first Premier League title in October 2011 in addition to the Pairs Championship.

With debts still hanging over the club at the end of the 2012 season, following the track alterations and championship season, club owners A&S Entertainments decided to sell the club, a new company was created with several key fans taking control of the club prior to the 2013 season. The club logo was also re-branded with the change of company, the old logo continues to be the club badge, and is still used for the Hall of Fame. In 2015, the stadium went under a multi-million pound redevelopment. In 2016, the Tigers won the Premier League KO cup against Newcastle Diamonds.

At the end of the 2017 season, work got underway to redevelop the track itself to create better racing. The track got widened and improved drainage was installed to help prevent rain-offs. For the 2018 season, the Tigers signed former Speedway Grand Prix rider and 2007 British GP winner Chris Harris. Halfway through the season team changes were needed to boost the chances of winning silverware, by signing in GP rider Craig Cook, replacing Richie Worrall.

The 2019 season saw the Tigers finish in second place in the SGB Championship. They reached the Play-Off Finals, but fell short by losing to league winners Leicester Lions by two points but did win the Pairs Championship. British speedway was cancelled for 2020 season due to the COVID-19 pandemic with only a few individual meetings getting underway behind closed-doors. In 2021, the Tigers finished second in the regular season table and reached the play off final before losing to Poole Pirates. They were knocked out of the SGB Championship KO cup semi-finals against rivals Edinburgh Monarchs.The Tigers finished runners-up in the 2021 SGB Championship Play-Off finals against the Poole Pirates, who completed a season double.

Logos

Season summary

Riders previous seasons

2006 team

2007 team

Also Rode:

2008 team

Also Rode:

2009 team

2010 team

Also Rode:

2011 team

Also Rode:

 (Broken Femur)
 (Broken Collarbone)

2012 team

Also Rode:

2013 team

Also Rode:

2015 team

Also Rode

2016 team

Also Rode

2017 team

2018 team
 Craig Cook
 Nathan Greaves
 Claus Vissing
 Paul Starke
 Chris Harris-Captain
 James Sarjeant
 Jack Thomas

Also rode:
 Richie Worrall
 Lewis Kerr

2019 team
 Craig Cook -Captain
 Rasmus Jensen
 Claus Vissing
 Sam Jensen
 Mikkel B Andersen
 Kyle Bickley
 Connor Bailey

Also rode:
 Paul Starke
 Luke Chessell
 James Sarjeant

2021 team

 Craig Cook -Captain
 Tom Brennan
 Broc Nicol
 Sam Jensen
 Ricky Wells- Captain
 Marcin Nowak
 Connor Bailey

Also rode:
 Jack Smith
 Ulrich Østergaard
 Justin Sedgman

2022 team

 (C)

Notable riders

STARs Hall Of Fame
 -  Inducted 2011
 -  Inducted 2011
 -  Inducted 2011
 - Inducted 2012
 - Inducted 2013
 - Inducted 2013

Other notable riders

Club honours

British League Division Two
Champions: 1993, 1994

British League Division Two Knock Out Cup
Winners: 1993, 1994

Premier League
Champions: 2011

Premier League Pairs
Champions: 2005, 2006, 2011, 2019

National Series
Winners: 1990

Premier League KO Cup
Champions: 2016

References

Speedway Premier League teams
SGB Championship teams
Sports teams in Glasgow
Motorsport in Scotland
Workington
Govan
Blantyre, South Lanarkshire
Coatbridge
1928 establishments in Scotland
Sports clubs established in 1928
Sports team relocations